Bond Girls Are Forever is a 2002 James Bond documentary film hosted by actress Maryam d'Abo, who played the role of Kara Milovy in the 15th James Bond film The Living Daylights. The film was accompanied by a 2003 book written by John Cork and d'Abo, Bond Girls Are Forever: The Women of James Bond. The film and the book are tributes to the elite club of women who have played the role of a Bond girl.

The TV film, which was released in November 2002 alongside Die Another Day, features interviews with a number of Bond girls who were featured throughout the film franchise between the first James Bond film, Dr. No (1962) starring Ursula Andress and the then-current 20th film Die Another Day starring Halle Berry. In 2003, the documentary was released on DVD and offered as a free gift with the purchase of Die Another Day on DVD by some retailers.

In 2006, a new version of the documentary, updated to include interviews with cast from Casino Royale and edited to include commercial breaks, was produced for the AMC network and was later released as a bonus feature on the March 2007 DVD and Blu-ray editions of Casino Royale.

A new 2012 version was shown on the Sky Movies 007 channel in the UK to include Quantum of Solace and Skyfall.

Emmy award–winning singer and songwriter Faith Rivera performed a rendition of "Nobody Does It Better" over the closing credits of the documentary.

Bond girls interviewed in order
Halle Berry
Ursula Andress
Honor Blackman
Luciana Paluzzi
Jill St. John
Jane Seymour
Maud Adams
Lois Chiles
Carey Lowell
Michelle Yeoh
Judi Dench
Samantha Bond
Rosamund Pike
Eva Green (2006 version)
Caterina Murino (2006 version)
Gemma Arterton (2008 version)
Naomie Harris (2012 version)
Bérénice Marlohe (2012 version)

References

External links

2002 television films
2002 films
2003 books
American documentary television films
Non-fiction books about James Bond
James Bond in film
Documentary films about women in film
2000s English-language films
2000s American films